Angiens is a commune in the Seine-Maritime department in the Normandy region in northern France.

Geography

Population

Places of interest
 The church of St.Martin & St.Sébastien, dating from the twelfth century.
 The eleventh century church at Iclon.
 The château de Silleron, dating from the sixteenth century
 The manorhouse de Roquefort.
 A sandstone cross, built in 1633.
 A feudal motte.

See also
Communes of the Seine-Maritime department

References

Communes of Seine-Maritime